Face the Crowd may refer to:

"Face the Crowd", single by Demian 1971
"Face the Crowd", song by Beady Eye

See also
Facing the Crowd, two outdoor sculptures by American artist Michael Stutz in Portland, Oregon